Copromorpha cryptochlora is a moth in the Copromorphidae family. It is found on the Comoros and Seychelles.

This species has a wingspan of 14mm.

Subspecies
Copromorpha cryptochlora cryptochlora (Comoros)
Copromorpha cryptochlora alixella Legrand, 1965 (Seychelles)

References

External links
Natural History Museum Lepidoptera generic names catalog

Copromorphidae
Moths described in 1930